is a Japanese supernatural manga created by Matsuri Akino. The series is focused on Kamishina Fuuto, a teenager who has spiritual senses, and his struggle to maintain a normal life while being a reincarnation of the High Priest of Darashaal.

The manga is published by Akita Shoten in 14 graphic novels. It was licensed and distributed in the United States by Tokyopop, but it seems that the project has been discontinued.

Plot 

In the distant country of Darashaal, they have found their leader of fifteen years of age. He is the 42nd High Priest of Darashaal, and is supposed to be a reincarnation of the first spiritual leader. But he isn't. The high priest is actually an impostor appointed by the Chinese government and the  Dragon god Nāga so the Chinese can claim the scared country. The real ruler is in Japan.

Kamishina Fuuto is a normal teenager who recently transferred schools. He can sense people's auras and hence sees the personality of the students . While lying on the lawn a large bird tries to approach him. It transforms into a half-man half-bird hybrid named Garuda. He claims that Fuuto is the true heir to the throne of Darashaal.

Throughout the story, though Fuuto refuses to take on his role as the Holy King, he learns almost the same lessons as the King should have. In his experiences with more Guardian Beasts and the Supernatural world, he grows to learn of mortality, and the roads people make for themselves and others.

Characters

Main characters
Fuuto Kamishina
Son of a world famous photographer living in Japan, Fuuto grew up loving his single mother and resenting his father for leaving the family. As a boy with strange powers which only increase over time, he is revealed to be the heir to the throne of Darashaal, a title and role he refuses to take.

Mayu
A young girl who uses a wheelchair and living in a castle with Prof Ichigo, she often appears to be either emotionless or angry. Mayu is able to see the guardian beasts and other spirits for who they are, sometimes she is the only one to sense something wrong. Her mind is often described as "a blank", and her voice has the uncanny power to stop Fuuto from using his power to destroy his surroundings whenever he is angry. For this reason, she is suspected to be the Holy King's Priestess.

Garuda
The first guardian beast who discovers Fuuto's heritage. To those without special powers he appears to be a large bird, but a select few sees him as a man with a bird's head and wings. He constantly frets and worries over Fuuto's well being, and a running gag in the manga is his pacing and other characters' remarks that Fuuto hates him because of his overprotectiveness. Sohki has once remarked that his greatest rival is Naga, and it was because of this rivalry that the last Holy King died.

Hanuman
The first assassin sent by Naga to kill the "Impostor King", Hanuman appears to be a small monkey with a childish air. Upon seeing Fuuto's healing abilities and genuine care for life, he hesitates, until a fight prompted by Genro occurs. After swearing loyalty to Fuuto, his role takes up most of the childish humor of the story. He appears to adore Sohki, much to Genro's chagrin.

Genro
A general wolf god who gets irritated whenever someone calls him a dog, Genro was sent by Naga to check on Hanuman's progress and to slay the Impostor King should the monkey fail. After witnessing Fuuto's abilities, he swears loyalty to him. Always looking for a good fight, he often calls Fuuto weak, though he would gladly risk his life for Fuuto's safety. As a swordsman his greatest rival is Ohko. Unlike Hanuman, Genro is extremely cautious around Sohki and often freaks when the latter gets too close to him.

Ohko
This tiger assassin broke into Ichijo's home to kill Fuuto only to realize that the Imposter King, along with Seishun and all his guardians, had been transported back in time. Sohki convinces him not to kill on sight, as Ohko has a rivalry with Genro that will never be settled if he obeyed Naga's orders. Later when Ohko loses his temper again, Sohki gives him a drink that knocks him out cold, much to Ichijo's disbelief. Militant like Genro, Ohko was extremely loyal to Atisha, but with Garuda's pressuring he decides to watch Fuuto for a while. Later when Naga and Atisha are in Japan, Genro concludes that Naga must have believed Ohko to have betrayed him and joined Fuuto. After nearly killing Mayu when trying to prove her as the Priestess, he is punished by Sohki and given to Count D. However, after being rescued from Fuuto, he acknowledges his power and decide to protect Fuuto as he finally begins to see him as the true priest.

Darashaal's people
Naga
The dragon god who appointed the current king to the throne, he is described to be the rival of Garuda. As of current times, Nāga is probably second in political power after the Holy King, as he often dispatches the assassins sent to kill Fuuto. He is suspicious of Sohki's motives, despite Sohki's claims that he wasn't like Naga and never plots anything. Naga knows his position allows him strong influence on Atisha, and thus feels threatened when Atisha expresses a free wish to go to Japan.

Atisha
The current king of Darashaal, he is often seen meditating in a locked, dark room. Fuuto's age, but almost his complete opposite in personality as he is humble and quiet. Naga is possibly the only one he talks to, as all the other servants remain in humble silence. He once spoke with Fuuto and accidentally switched bodies, but does not appear to be truly aware of Fuuto's identity. Rather, he chooses instead to go to Japan so that he can meet him again, where he also gains an interest in Mayu.

Sohki
The Kirin, who is supposedly the only beast not under the command or control of the Holy King and his subjects. He is blind and deaf, but can read thoughts. Sohki often teases and mocks anyone he meets, but when serious he is said to be able to easily destroy Japan. Though he is the only one who can tell which King is the rightful one, he refuses to do so as he claims that it was merely another fight between Garuda and Naga. When Ohko nearly kills Mayu, he is the only one who could punish the tiger spirit. He likes Hanuman to point of always trying to kidnap him every time they meet.

Lamia
The snake guardian beast, in ancient Greece and the orient, she was feared as a succubus, and is very clever and tenacious. Lamia was the first female assassin sent by Naga to slay the 'impostor king'. When she realizes Fuuto could resist her power, she begins to question who the true heir is. Lamia is the one who first tries to seek Sohki so that the true king may be revealed, when he does not answer her she returns to Darashaal. Later when Atisha stars in a Japanese spirit show, she appears as his interpreter.

Yamantaka
Third assassin sent by Naga after Genro and Hanuman were 'brainwashed by the false king', he is a minotaur who confronts Fuuto when the boy is on a school field trip without his guardians. When Shakyamuni's disciples interfere and Yamantaka accidentally damages one of them, an angry Fuuto teleports him several miles away. After that, he begins to question the king Naga has appointed. Unlike Lamia, he is unwilling to seek Sohki out, and instead returns to Darashaal where he makes a brief appearance at Naga's side going over international invitations from other countries.

Humans
Kimihiko Ichigo
The guardian of Mayu, this 32-year-old man is a graduate of Meio Academy and a multi-field scholar from an ancient Kyoto family. He's very interested in the supernatural, even though he has no sixth sense himself. For a world-renowned individual, he's actually quite easy going. He has no fashion sense, tends to collect the strangest things, and designed his home in a European Castle style that tend to give the mistaken impression of a love hotel. He has connections to various government and TV agencies, which has proven to be important to the storyline.

Tserin
Fuuto's mother, originally from a nomadic tribe in Tibet. When she met photographer Kento Kamishina, she married him and followed him to Japan. Though kind and gentle, she is in a constant state of anxiety both due to Fuuto's strange powers and the fear of being discovered by Kento's mother, whom she mistakenly thought would try to deport her.

Kento Kamishina
Fuuto's father, a world famous photographer, and currently missing. He disliked his family business and at 18 left so that he could pursue his hobby of taking photos. A constant traveller, he met Tserin while travelling in Tibet, and eventually married her. Kento is best remembered for his words about the awe of the universe when one is alone looking at the skies. Fuuto met him when he was experimenting with spiritual form, and found that his father has amnesia.

Takako Kamishina
Kento's mother, Fuuto's grandmother, and the godmother of a Yakuza family. She is a dignified and may appear to be a fierce figure, but her love for Kento and Fuuto is true. After clearing a misunderstanding with Tserin, she asks for them to move in with her. Despite Tserin's refusal, the family now gets along well. Though she describes her clan as conservative and unaggressive, she is more than willing to mobilize them for Fuuto. Her name still commands respect, as Fuuto finds out when other Yakuza won't touch him due to his lineage of 'Kamishina the Third'.

Seishun Abeno
A friend of Fuuto's and descendant of Abe no Seimei, he is heir of the divinatory family in Kyoto. He has an inferiority complex due to his lack of occult power and decided to study astronomy at a Tokyo university. He may appear to be a fragile and rich boy, but is extremely intelligent and can easily adjust to new situations, as proven whenever he is dragged into one of Fuuto's adventures. His family is distinctly related to Ichigo's.

Abe no Kagari
Granddaughter of Abe no Seimei who looks exactly like Mayu, but is stubborn and full of curiosity. Further unlike Mayu is her highly emotional state and the fact that she can't keep her feelings from showing. Kagari was first seen with Watanabe no Tsuna when Fuuto and Seishun touched the old Samurai sword Higekiri. Initially mistaking them as demons, then getting annoyed when she learns that Seishun may be an illegitimate brother, she eventually grows fond of them. She appears to be on good terms with Sakata no Kintoki.

Other Characters, in order of appearance
Yuuya: A little boy whom Fuuto meets at their apartment building. He was an abused child, and when Fuuto tried to heal him, he saw him being abused due to his powers. He takes Yuuya home with him and leaves him in his mother's care while he went to confront his Yuuya's mother. He found out that she was abused too as a child and Garuda told him that it was because of transmigration. Fuuto uses his powers to heal the mother, and she goes to get Yuuya showing her concern now that she was healed. When she and Yuuya were walking home, they are hit by a moving vehicle and Yuuya dies. Fuuto gets upset because Garuda told him that Yuuya's fate couldn't be changed. Fuuto thinks that everything he did was pointless, but Garuda said that the two would be much closer in their next lives because of him.

Souici: An old friend of Fuuto's, after Fuuto disappeared Souici has stayed locked up in his room for five years. His mother contacted Fuuto for help, and after a near-death experience Fuuto succeeds. This arc is also the first time Fuuto saw the palace of Dhalashar.

Ayana Katsuragi: A female student who seemed strangely forward with Fuuto about her interest, she managed to convince him to leave his guardians and never see Mayu again. After nearly killing him, Mayu reveals her identity and misguided intentions.

Aruma: The twelve-year-old first princess of 5th century BC Persia, Fuuto met her during his first time-travelling adventure. His appearance triggered her wedding, and Fuuto did not realize until too late that the wedding was a sacrifice.

Kushinada: During a school play, Fuuto has another time adventure where Kushinada is meant to be the next sacrifice for a serpent god. Fuuto is mistaken as a champion sent to save the people, and along with Kushinada he goes to confront the creature, where the terrible truth is revealed.

Tsukasa Kugahara: One of Fuuto's classmates, he is a soft-spoken boy whose family own a hospital clinic. He himself is smart student and often treats abused animals. Fuuto however proves he has a darker side.

Eriko Kawai: A girl in Fuuto's class whose family fell into debt after her father disappeared on them shortly after losing his job. Fuuto relates to her because both their fathers are missing.  He helps her family recover by asking his Yakuza grandmother for help and then convincing Eriko's father not to commit suicide.

Watanabe no Tsuna: Fuuto and Seishun travelled to his time when they touched his sword Higekiri. Tsuna is famous in legend as someone who cut off the arm of a demoness named Ibaraki, but was later deceived to return it after Ibaraki took the form of his nanny requesting to see the arm. In order to amend his wrongs he follows the samurai troop under Minamoto no Yorimitsu into Mount Ooe.

Kidoumaru: A famous thief known to work at the Rashomon Gate, he witnessed Fuuto's healing ability and kidnaps him in the attempt to save his dying brother Kotetsu. Kidoumaru steals only from the very rich to feed parentless children, as his boss Kioumaru of Mount Ooe has done. Later he himself is kidnapped and beaten by Minamoto no Yorimitsu in Yorimitsu's attempt to gain information about Kioumaru, whom Yorimitsu claims is the real demon.

Naomi Aoyama: Class president in Fuuto's class, despite her constant smiles Fuuto senses no happiness from her; like Mayu she is empty. They ended up volunteering in a Senior Home, and when Fuuto hears the last wish of an old lady named Fumi, he switches the spirits of Naomi and Aoyama. In the body of a dying woman, Naomi nearly dies and in doing so finally finds herself. After fulfilling Fumi's last wish, Fuuto returns just in time to switch back the spirits, ensuring Fumi's peaceful death and helping Naomi become her own person.

Guest appearances

The Guardians here are creatures of mixed mythological legends. Garuda is a large mythical bird or bird-like creature that appears in both Hindu and Buddhist mythology, and here he can be seen in his half-human half-bird form. Hanuman is one of the most important personalities in the Indian epic, the Ramayana—here he is drawn as a childlike monkey (Japanese Son Goku). The Kirin made an appearance here and is known as 'Souki-sama', he is play like, mischievous and likes to verbally battle with the other guardians. He is the guest of Count D in his Petshop in Shinjuku, Tokyo.

Release

Volume list

References

External links
Genju no Seiza at Tokyopop's website

Shōjo manga
Akita Shoten manga
Tokyopop titles